Bob Acres is a character in Richard Brinsley Sheridan's The Rivals.

Acres was a coward, whose "courage always oozed out at his finger ends".  He was popularly played in the 19th century by American actor Joseph Jefferson.  (Jefferson named a Louisiana train station after this character; see Bob Acres, Louisiana.)

References

Acres, Bob
Acres, Bob
Acres, Bob
Acres, Bob
Acres, Bob